Robert Allan White (born 15 October 1979) is a former English professional cricketer and current umpire.

Biography 

Born 15 October 1979, Chelmsford, Essex, White received his upper school education at Stowe School in Buckinghamshire before attending Durham (St John's College) and Loughborough Universities. 

He played cricket for Northamptonshire. He was a right-handed batsman and bowl off breaks. His limited overs high score was 111 versus Warwickshire at Northampton in 2008, while his first-class high score is 277 versus Gloucester at Northampton, which holds the record for the highest maiden century in the United Kingdom including 107 before lunch on the first day. During the same innings, he set the club's record first wicket partnership of 375 with Mark Powell. His nickname amongst teammates is 'Toff', whilst a 'player profile' set up for a televised Twenty20 match listed his 'favourite food' as 'anything posh' – a joke by team-mates. His brother-in-law, Ryan Cummins, has also played for Northamptonshire. 

In July 2012, it was announced that White would be leaving the Northamptonshire club at the season end.

References

External links

Northants Cricket Page

1979 births
Living people
English cricketers
Northamptonshire cricketers
People educated at Stowe School
Alumni of Loughborough University
Loughborough MCCU cricketers
Buckinghamshire cricketers
English cricket umpires
British Universities cricketers
Durham MCCU cricketers
Alumni of St John's College, Durham